This is a list of high schools in the Commonwealth of Puerto Rico.

Adjuntas Municipality

José Emilio Lugo High School

Aguada Municipality

Escuela Superior Arsenio Martínez
Escuela Superior Dr. Carlos González

Aguadilla Municipality

First Bilingual Preparatory School
Benito Cerezo Vázquez
Colegio San Carlos
Liceo Aguadillano
Juan Suárez Pelegrina
Vocacional Salvador Fuentes
Colegio Corpus Christi
Ramey High School
Carib Christian School
Advanced Bilingual School
Academia Adventista
Escuela Antolina Velez 
(Interamericana)
Friedrich Froebel Bilingual School

Aguas Buenas Municipality

Josefa Pastrana School
Escuela Urbana De Aguas Buenas

Aibonito Municipality

Dr. José N. Gándara School

Añasco Municipality

Luis Muñoz Marín School
Sergio Ramírez de Arellano-Hostos Regional Bilingual Secondary School

Arecibo Municipality

Abelardo Martínez Otero School
Academia Adventista del Norte
Colegio San Felipe
Dra. María Cadilla De Martínez Urban Community High School
Hogar Colegio La Milagrosa
Superior Vocacional Antonio Lucchetti
Trina Padilla De Sanz School

Arroyo Municipality

Carmen Bozello De Huyke School - La High de Arroyo
Natividad Rodriguez - New High School

Barceloneta Municipality

Fernando Suria Chávez School
Academia Nuestra Señora de Fátima

Barranquitas Municipality

Luis Muñoz Marín School, Código escolar : 26021
Pablo Colón Berdecía School, Código escolar:

Bayamón Municipality

Academia Claret
Academia Discípulos de Cristo
Agustín Stahl High School
Academia Santo Tomás de Aquino Superior
Agustín Stahl School
American School
Antilles High School, Fort Buchanan
Avanze 2000 ( Wilma Chavez)
Bayamón Military Academy (B.M.A.)
Baldwin School
Colegio Adazul
Cacique Agüeybaná Superior School
Colegio Beato Carlos Manuel Rodríguez (Antigua Escuela Superior Católica)
Colegio Hostosiano de Puerto Rico
Colegio De La Salle
Colegio Luterano Santísima Trinidad
Colegio Nelson Velázquez
Colegio Nuestra Señora del Rosario
Colegio Pedro "EL GALLERO" Flores
Colegio Sagrada Familia
Colegio San Agustín
Colegio Santa Rosa Superior
Colegio Santiago Apóstol
Escuela Ecológica Siglo XXI Dr. José Antonio Dávila 
Emadrian Bilingual School
:es:Escuela Especializada en Bellas Artes Pablo Casals
Miguel De Cervantes Saavedra School
Miguel Meléndez Muñoz School
Papa Juan XXIII (23) School
Pedro P. Casablanca School
Puerto Rico Advancement College (PRACI)
Rexville Superior School
Tomás C. Ongay School

Cabo Rojo Municipality

Monserrate León de Irizarry High School
Colegio San Agustín
Cabo Rojo Christian Academy
Inés María Mendoza High School
Luiz Munoz marin
Colberg

Caguas Municipality

Colegio Católico Notre Dame
Academia Cristo de los Milagros
Caguas Military Academy
Colegio Bautista de Caguas
Colegio San José de Villa Blanca
Colegio San Juan Apóstol
Colegio Santa Rosa Superior
Dr. Juan José Osuna School
Felipe Rivera Centeno School
Colegio Kiany
José Gautier Benítez
Manuela Toro Morice
New Generation Christian Academy (formerly, Colegio Las Americas)
Thomas Alva Edison School
Caguas Private School
Eloisa Pascual
Escuela Vocacional-Rep de Costa Rica
Esc. Felix A Gonzalez

Camuy Municipality

Luis F. (Pipo) Crespo High School
Pablo Avila Superior School (Old High School)
Santiago R. Palmer Superior School

Canóvanas Municipality

Antonio R. Barceló School
Colegio Nuestra Señora del Pilar
Eduardo García Carrillo School
Georgina Baquero School
Luis Hernáiz Veronne School

Carolina Municipality

Academia del Carmen
Academia Presbiteriana
Ángel P. Millán Rohena School
Carlos F. Daniels Vocacional De Área School
Carvin School, Inc.
Calvary Baptist Christian School
C.I.E.M. (Centro de Instrucción y Educación Moderna) Private School
Colegio Bautista
Colegio De Diego De Carolina
Colegio María Auxiliadora
Colegio Luterano Resurrección
Colegio Miguel García
Colegio Nuestra Señora de Lourdes
Colegio Santa Gema
Dr. José M. Lázaro School
Fountain Christian Bilingual School
Gilberto Concepción De Gracia School
Lola Rodríguez De Tió School
Lorenzo Vizcarrondo School
Luz América Calderón School
Manuel Febres González School
Saint Francis School
Jesús María Sanromá School
Colegio Cervantes

Cataño Municipality

Francisco Oller School

Cayey Municipality

Benjamin Harrison School
Academia La Milagrosa
Colegio Radians
Miguel Meléndez Muñoz High School
Colegio La Merced

Ceiba Municipality

Santiago Iglesias Pantín School

Ciales Municipality

Colegio Nuestra Señora del Rosario
Juan A. Corretjer School

Cidra Municipality

Ana J. Candelas School
Luis Muñoz Iglesias
Superior Vocacional 
Escuela Especializada Bilingüe

Coamo Municipality

Colegio Nuestra Señora de Valvanera
José Felipe Zayas School
Ramón José Dávila School

Comerío Municipality

Juana Colón School
Escuela Superior Vocacional Antolín Santos Negrón

Corozal Municipality

Colegio Sagrada Familia
Emilio R. Delgado School
Porfirio Cruz García School
Escuela Manuel Bou Gali

Culebra Municipality

Antonio R. Barceló School

Dorado Municipality

Dorado Academy
José S. Alegría High School
T.A.S.I.S. (The American School In Switzerland) Dorado

Fajardo Municipality

Ana Delia Flores Superior Vocacional School
Colegio Santiago Apóstol
Vanguard Christian Academy
Dr. Santiago Véve Calzada School
Escuela Evangélica Unida de Fajardo
Fajardo Community Private School
Colegio Sonifel
Fajardo Academy

Florida Municipality

Juan Ponce De León II School

Guánica Municipality

Aurea E. Quiles High School
Escuela Franklin D. Roosevelt (superior)
Escuela Beata Imelda (Privada Catolica)

Guayama Municipality

Escuela Especializada en Ciencias y Matemáticas Genaro Cautiño Vazquez
Adela Brenes Texidor School
Colegio San Antonio
Dr. Rafael López Landrón School
Escuela de La Comunidad Oscar Hernández Guevara
Francisco García Boyrie School
Guamani Private School
San Alfonso de Ligorio Catholic High School
San Antonio Academy
Mid-wood High School of Brooklyn
Academia Adventista del sur
Saint Patrick Bilingual School

Guayanilla Municipality

Arístides Cales Quiros School
Asunción Rodríguez De Sala School
Francisco Rodríguez López High School

Guaynabo Municipality

Academia San José
American Military Academy
Colegio Adianez
Colegio Jesucristo Rey de Reyes
Colegio Marista Guaynabo
Colegio Nuestra Sra. de Belén
Colegio Puertorriqueño de Niñas (C.P.N.)
Colegio Rosa Bell
Colegio Sagrados Corazones
Colegio San Pedro Mártir de Verona
Escuela Mercedes Morales
Escuela Rosalina C. Martínez
Fowlers Academy
Josefina Barceló High School
Margarita Janer High School
Commonwealth-Parkville School
Wesleyan Academy

Gurabo Municipality

Colegio San Ignacio
Dra. Conchita Cuevas School
American Academy

Hatillo Municipality

Colegio Evangélico Capitán Correa
Academia Interamericana De Arecibo
 Colegio Nuestra Señora Del Carmen
Lorenzo Coballes Gandía School
Padre Aníbal Reyes Belén School

Hormigueros Municipality

Segundo Ruiz Belvis

Humacao Municipality

Ana Roqué De Duprey School
Colegio del Perpetuo Socorro
Colegio San Antonio Abad
Eastern Bilingual School
The Palmas Academy - Palmas del Mar
Petra Mercado Bougart School
Superior Vocacional Manuel Mediavilla Negron School
Su Agapito Lopez Flores
La Carlos Rivera Ufret

Isabela Municipality

Dr. Heriberto Domenech School
Francisco Mendoza School
Colegio de Aprendizaje Integral Cristiano
Escuela Especializada en Bellas Artes
Montclaire
Colegio San Antonio

Jayuya Municipality

Josefina León Zayas School

Juana Díaz Municipality

Carmen Belén Veiga School
Dr. Máximo Donoso Sánchez School
Josefa Cangiano Toro School
Luis Lloréns Torres School

Juncos Municipality

Isabel Flores School
José Collazo Colón School
AAFET
Alfonso Dias Lebron

Lajas Municipality

Leonides Morales Rodríguez School

Lares Municipality

Domingo Aponte Collazo School
Gabriela Mistral School
Ramón de Jesús Sierra
S.U. Bartolo School

Las Marías Municipality

Escuela Superior Eva y Patria Custodio

Las Piedras Municipality

Escuela Superior Vocacional Ramón Power Y Giralt
Escuela Superior Florencia García
Colegio Superior Rubí

Loíza Municipality

 Carlos Escobar Lopez School
 Superior Vocacional de Loíza

Luquillo Municipality

Isidro A Sánchez Escuela Superior

Manatí Municipality

Academia Cristiana de Manatí
Academia Discípulos de Cristo
Colegio de la Inmaculada Concepción
Colegio Marista
Fernando Callejo School
Jesús T. Piñero
José A Montanez Genaro School
Juan S. Marchand
Juan A. Sánchez Dávila
Petra Corretjer De O'Neill School
Piaget Bilingual Academy

Maricao Municipality

Raul Ybarra high school
Escuela Superior Urbana

Maunabo Municipality

Alfonso Casta Martínez School

Mayagüez Municipality

Academia Adventista del Oeste
Academia Inmaculada Concepción
C.R.O.E.M. (Centro Residencial de  Educativas de Mayagüez) School
Colegio de La Milagrosa
Colegio Presbiteriano Pablo Casasus
Colegio San Benito
Dr. Pedro Perea Fajardo School
Eugenio María De Hostos School
José De Diego Superior School
PRACI Oeste (Puerto Rico Advancement College)
S.E.S.O. (Southwestern Educational Society)
Colegio Episcopal San Andrés

Moca Municipality

Marcelino Rodríguez School
Nueva Escuela Superior School

Morovis Municipality

Escuela Dr. Pedro N. Ortiz

Naguabo Municipality

Juan José Maunez School
Rafael Rocca High School

Naranjito Municipality

Francisco Morales High School
Vocacional New High School
Academia Santa Teresita

Orocovis Municipality

José Rojas Cortés School

Peñuelas Municipality

Urbana (Nueva) Superior School
Maria Teresa Umbridge Academy

Ponce Municipality

Academia Adventista del Sur
Academia Alexandra
Academia Cristo Rey
Academia Santa María Reina
 Academia Ponce Interamericana
Colegio CEDAS
Colegio del Sagrado Corazón
Colegio Episcopal Santísima Trinidad
Colegio La Milagrosa
Colegio Mercedario San Judas Tadeo
Colegio Ponceño
Colegio San Conrado
Colegio Sagrada Familia
Dr. Alfredo M. Aguayo High School (Ponce Playa; closed)
Escuela de Bellas Artes (Calle Lolita Tizol; grades 1 thru 12) 
Escuela Especializada en Ciencias y Matematicas Thomas Armstrong Toro
Escuela Especializada Ramón Marín (Special Education; includes grades 1 thru 12)
Escuela Libre de Música (Calle Lolita Tizol; grades 1 thru 12)
Escuela Superior Bethzaida Velazquez Andujar (in Urb. Las Delicias)
Escuela Superior Dr. Manuel de la Pila Iglesias
Escuela Superior Jardines de Ponce
Escuela Superior Juan Serrallés (Barrio Coto Laurel)
Escuela Superior Lila Mayoral Wirshing (Barrio El Tuque)
Escuela Superior Vocacional Bernardino Cordero Bernard
Instituto de Música Juan Morel Campos (grades 7 thru 12)
Family Christian Academy
Fountain Christian Bilingual School
Liceo Ponceño
Ponce Christian Academy
Ponce High School

Quebradillas Municipality

Juan Alejo de Arizmendi School
Manuel Ramos Hernández Superior School

Rincón Municipality

Manuel García Pérez (Nueva) School

Río Grande Municipality

Superior Casiano Cepeda
Superior Urbana Pedro Falú Orellano
Academia Cristiana Canaán
Academia Regional Adventista del Este
Colegio Nuestra Señora del Carmen
Colegio Bautista Rosa De Sarón
The Kingdom Christian Academy

Sabana Grande Municipality

Academia Adventista del Suroeste
Academia San Agustin Espiritu Santo
Escuela Superior Luis Negrón López

Salinas Municipality

Albergue Olímpico School
Stella Márquez School
Superior Urbana

San Germán Municipality

Academia Sangermeña
Colegio San José
Escuela de San Germán Interamericana
Escuela Laura Mercado
Escuela Lola Rodríguez de Tió

San Juan Municipality

Academia Bárbara Ann Roessler
Academia del Perpetuo Socorro
Academia María Reina
Academia Menonita
Academia Santa Monica, Santurce
Academia Sagrado Corazón
Academia San Jorge
Academia San José
Academia Santa Teresita, Santurce
Albert Einstein School
Amalia Marín School
American Military Academy
Antonio Sarriera Egozcue School
Berwind Superior School
Bonneville School, Río Piedras
Escuela Central de Artes Visuales–
Escuela Dáskalos
Colegio Calasanz
Colegio Espíritu Santo
Colegio Congregación Mita
Colegio Lourdes, Hato Rey
Colegio Nuestra Señora de Lourdes, Río Piedras
Colegio Nstra. Sra. Del Carmen, Río Piedras
Colegio Nstra. Sra. De la Guadalupe, Puerto Nuevo
Colegio Nstra. Sra. de La Merced, Hato Rey
Colegio Nuestra Señora de la Providencia
Colegio San Ignacio de Loyola, Río Piedras
Colegio San Antonio, Río Piedras
Colegio San José, Río Piedras
Colegio San Vicente de Paúl
Commonwealth-Parkville School, Commonwealth Campus in Hato Rey
Cupey María Montessori School, Río Piedras
Cupeyville School
Dr. Facundo Bueso Sanllehí School
Dr. José Celso Barbosa School
Ernesto Ramos Antonini Musical School
Episcopal Cathedral School, Santurce
Escuela Especializada Bilingüe Padre Rufo
Escuela Especializada en Ciencias y Matemáticas University Gardens
Escuela Libre de Música
Escuela Superior Comercial Rafael Cordero
Lic. Guillermo Atiles Moreu School, Hato Rey
Gabriela Mistral School
José Julián Acosta School
Juan José Osuna School
Juan Ponce De León School
Madame Luchetti School
Miguel Such School
Padre Rufo Bilingual School
Programa Educativo Alcance
Rafael Cordero School
Ramón Power Y Giralt School
Ramón Vilá Mayo School
República De Colombia School
Robinson School
Saint John's School
St. Mary's School, Cupey
Trina Padilla De Sanz School
University Gardens High School (UGHS)
University of Puerto Rico Secondary School (UHS)

San Lorenzo Municipality

Cristo Redentor (in front of the old cemetery)
 José Campeche School
María Cruz Buitrago School
María Teresa Delgado Marcano
S.U. Carlos Zayas
Vocacional Antonio Fernós Isern
Gerardo Sellés Solá
Luis Muñoz Rivera

San Sebastián Municipality

Emilio Scharon Rodríguez High School
Manuel Méndez Liciaga Vocacional School
Patria Latorre Ramírez High School
Academia San Sebastián Mártir
 San Sebastian High School

Santa Isabel Municipality

Elvira Colón High School

Toa Alta Municipality

Escuela Adela Rolón Fuentes
Nicolás Sevilla School

Toa Baja Municipality

Academia Espiritu Santo
Adolfina Irizarry School
Colegio Carmen Sol
Dr. Pedro Albizu Campos School
María Teresa Piñeiro School
 Christian Nazarene Academy

Trujillo Alto Municipality

Africa García School
Antilles Military Academy
Avanze 2000 (Wilma Chaves)
Colegio Santa María del Camino
Colegio Santa Cruz
Medardo Carazo School
Petra Zenón De Fabery School
Pomayuán Private School

Utuado Municipality

 José Vizcarrondo School
Judith A. Vivas School
Luis Muñoz Rivera School (Under renovation)
Antonio Reyes Padilla Occupational School
Colegio San Miguel (closed)

Vega Alta Municipality

Academia Cambú
Academia Discípulos de Cristo
Colegio De La Vega
Ileana de Gracía School
 Ladislao Martínez School

Vega Baja Municipality

Academia Regional Adventista del Norte
Christian Military Academy
Colegio Ivosai
Colegio Nuestra Señora del Rosario
Colegio Génesis
Juan Quirindongo Morell School
Lino Padrón Rivera School
North Point
Specialized School in Math and Science Brígida Álvarez Rodríguez

Vieques Municipality

 German Rieckehoff School

Villalba Municipality

Escuela Superior Vocacional
Lysander Borrero Terry School
Centro Residencial de Opportunidades Educativas de Villalba (CROEV)

Yabucoa Municipality

Colegio Dr. Roque Díaz Tizol
Luis Muñoz School
Ramón Quiñones School
Teodoro Aguilar Mora School

Yauco Municipality

Colegio de La Virgen del Santísimo Rosario (Holy Rosary)
Loáiza Cordero del Rosario (Abigail Ortiz de Lucena)
Luis Muñoz Marín School
Santiago Rivera Garcia Vocacional School
Vocacional de Area Santiago Rivera García
Yauco High School

See also

List of school districts in Puerto Rico

References

External links 
List of high schools in Puerto Rico from SchoolTree.org

Puerto Rico
High schools in Puerto Rico
High schools
Puerto Rico